is a mobile game developed by Colopl. The game is published by Bandai Namco Entertainment and released on iOS and Android. An anime adaptation by Kamikaze Douga premiered on January 20, 2022. On May 10, 2022, Bandai Namco announced that the game would be shutdown on July 19 of the same year, at 19:00 PDT, and the official website for both the game and anime adaptation would be taken down.

Development
In October 2020, the name Tales of Luminaria was trademarked by Bandai Namco Entertainment in Europe and Japan. At Gamescom 2021, the game was officially revealed, and set to release on iOS and Android. In September 2021, it was announced the game would be developed by Colopl, with Sekina Aoi, Okina Baba, Shunsaku Yano, and Takashi Tanaka handling scenario writing. Shun Saeki handled the character designs and Go Shiina composed the music. The opening animation is produced by Kamikaze Douga and Sunrise. Three songs are created for the game, the inspire song, "Answer" by Frederic and Keina Suda, the opening theme song, "Tomoshi Beat" by Frederic, and the ending theme song,  by Keina Suda. The game was released on November 3, 2021, in Japan and November 4, 2021, internationally. The Japanese version supports English and Japanese voices and text at launch with no option to change the voice language, while the Global version only has English voices and text, with the Japanese voice option being added on March 29, 2022. 

On May 10 2022, about six months since the game's official launch, the Luminaria development team announced that the game would be shutdown on July 19 of the same year, at 19:00 PDT. All work on any unreleased episodic content during that time would be halted, except for a special "Episode Final" focused around Hugo that leads into the anime adaptation.

Plot
The setting of Luminaria revolves around ancient beings known as Primordial Beasts. When these beasts died, mana flowed from their corpses that gave birth to the world of the present. The humans who lived among them split into two major factions. On one side: the Jerle Federation, a group of city-states who worshipped the Primordial Beasts and live in harmony with them. Most of their fighters carry "Embleo" on their bodies that allow them to tap into hidden reserves of magic power when needed. The Federation's military is about to graduate new students from its elite Blaze Class into the army to defend their nation from enemy incursion. On the other side: the Gildllan Empire, which sees the Primordial Beasts and their mana as a mere means to an end, and exploits them to build high-tech cities for their nation's prosperity. The Empire equips their fighters with "Reactors" that allows them to tap into mana reserves through artificial means. The conflict between the two factions is about to erupt as the Empire's new Lord Chancellor, August Wallenstein, has plans to conquer the world after taking revenge on those who murdered his family. Meanwhile, an unaffiliated group of Adventurers tries to discover the true link between the Primordial Beasts, mana, and the potential fate of the world.

Main Characters
All 21 playable characters are unlocked from the start (after completing the tutorial missions as Leo). The developers had planned to release new episodes for each character on a weekly basis, with eight additional "Crossroad" episodes that involve multiple character perspectives. As of February 2022, all characters had at least one story episode released, including one Crossroad episode. When the game was shut down, not all characters had Episode 2 of their stories released.

Gameplay
Unlike other games with a gacha system, Luminaria allows players to use any of 21 playable characters from the start. The gacha system is primarily used to obtain various weapons and costumes to increase the characters' level cap and battle power, with super rare 5-star outfits and weapons unlocking powerful new "Mystic Artes" for the character wearing them that can be used in battle. 

Players can choose to play through an individual character's story chapter, or join a party of up to four players for co-op boss battles known as "Fave Fests." The Fave Fests are rotated on a weekly basis, where players choose their favorite of three characters wielding that week's chosen weapon type to use in the battle. Rewards are doled out as players collect more points at the end of the battle, and players can retry as many times as they like.

Most of the gameplay relies on a large button placed near the center of the screen of the player's device. By dragging it in a direction they can move their character, and by tapping it or holding it in place for a second, they make their character unleash attacks that differ depending on the character and the weapon they hold. Characters can also unleash Mystic Artes which are charged by landing enough attacks on enemies, or tap another button to make their character instantly consume an equipped recipe for its healing effects.

Anime adaptation

In September 2021, an anime adaptation produced by Kamikaze Douga and Anima, titled Tales of Luminaria: The Fateful Crossroad, was announced. The ONA series was streamed internationally by Funimation and Crunchyroll. The series is directed by Shiori Kato and Midori Kato, with scripts by Yoriko Tomita, character designs by Shun Saeki, and composing by Go Shiina. It premiered as a two-part special on January 21, 2022.

References

External links
  
 

2021 video games
2022 anime ONAs
Android (operating system) games
Anime based on video games
Bandai Namco games
Funimation
IOS games
Luminaria, Tales of
Video games developed in Japan
Video games scored by Go Shiina